Michael Allemeier CMC (born 1967) is South African-born Canadian who is an Instructor of Culinary Arts at SAIT Polytechnic and former Executive Chef at Mission Hill Family Estate in Westbank, British Columbia, Bishops in Vancouver, and Teatro in Calgary.

Chef Allemeier has served in his current position since August 2009. He provides instruction to hundreds of students in the School of Hospitality and Tourism at SAIT.

While at Mission Hill Family Estate, Chef Allemeier oversaw all food operations at the winery including the Terrace Restaurant, Private Dining, Banquets, Culinary Workshops and a product line of winery made preserves. 

Chef Allemeier is a host on Food Network's and Gusto's Cook Like a Chef.

In 2001, Chef Allemeier earned the title of Certified Chef de Cuisine (CCC), Canada's second highest professional culinary accreditation designation. He describes his style of cooking as "Cuisine de Terroir." 

In 2017, Chef Allemeier earned his Certified Master Chef (CMC) designation. He was the third Canadian Chef to earn this trade designation.

International Youth
Allemeier was born in Johannesburg South Africa in 1967. He lived most of his youth outside of Canada in places including Hong Kong where he developed an appreciation for diverse culinary styles.

Bishop's
Allemeier came to prominence as a chef during his 7 years at Vancouver's Bishop’s restaurant. For his last 5 years, Allemeier served as Executive Chef.

Whistler & Calgary
After leaving Bishop's, Allemeier spent a year running the Kitchen at the Wildflower Restaurant in the Fairmont Chateau Whistler in Whistler, British Columbia before moving to Calgary, Alberta to serve as Executive Chef at Teatro from 1998 to 2002. From 2002 to 2003, Allemeier was the consulting Executive Chef at Wrayton's Fresh Market in Calgary.

Cooking for Presidents
On April 4, 1993, Allemeier cooked the dinner meal for President of the United States Bill Clinton and President of the Russian Federation Boris Yeltsin during their summit meeting in Vancouver, British Columbia.

Mission Hill Family Estate
Allemeier moved to the Okanagan Valley of British Columbia in 2003 to accept the position of Executive Winery Chef at Mission Hill Winery. As the Winery Chef, Allemeier designed menus that complement the estate's wine offerings with a focus on locally produced, sustainable ingredients. During his time at Mission Hill, Travel Leisure Magazine recognized The Terrace Restaurant as one of the "Top Five Winery Restaurants" in the world.

Becoming a Master Chef
On June 11, 2017, Chef Allemeier completed his CMC (Certified Master Chef), becoming Canada's third Chef to achieve this designation. The CMC (Certified Master Chef) is the most demanding and highest culinary designation in Canada and is internationally recognized in the industry as a Master of the Craft.

Television
 Grocery Bags - W Network 2008
 Thirsty Traveler - Food Network Canada 2007
 Chef at Large - Food Network Canada 2006
Allemeier is one of the Host Chefs of Cook Like a Chef. As a host he filmed 20 episodes of Food Network's Cook Like a Chef, including:

Season One
 Fish Episode
 Game Episode
 Pasta Episode
 Pork Episode
 Potatoes Episode
 Soufflé Episode
 Turkey Episode

Season Two
 Beans Episode
 Desserts Episode
 Fowl Episode
 Game Episode
 Nuts & Seeds Episode
 Sauces Episode

Season Three
 Baking Episode
 Shellfish Episode
 Vegetables Episode

Season Four
 BBQ Episode
 Cheese Episode
 Pressure Cooker Episode
 Mushroom Episode

Education
 Kelvin High School Grade 12 1985
 Red River Community College 1989, Cook's Apprentice Levels I-III
 Red Seal Journeyman's Paper 1989
 Cona Sucre D'art 1994, Sugar Forms & Usage
 Chateau Whister Resort 1997, Kitchen Leadership
 SAIT 2001, CCC Certification Coursework
 Canadian Culinary Institute 2001, Certified Chef de Cuisine
 ISG 2006, Wine Fundamentals I
 WSET 2015, WSET II
 Canadian Culinary Institute, Humber College, 2017, Certified Master Chef

Awards
 Vancouver Magazine - Best Winery/Vineyard Dining April 2009
 Urban Diner - Best Winery restaurant April 2009
 Chaine des Rotisseurs - Silver Star of Excellence (October 2008)
 Travel & Leisure Magazine – Best Winery Restaurant in the World (2008)
 Canadian Culinary Institute - Certified Chef de Cuisine (2001)
 Vancouver Magazine - Gold Medal Best Winery/Vineyard Dining (2008)
 Vancouver Magazine - Silver Medal Best Okanagan Restaurant (2007)
 Vancouver Magazine - Gold Medal Best Okanagan Restaurant (2006)
 Vancouver Magazine - Silver Medal Best Okanagan Restaurant (2005)
 Master Chef (June 2017)

Personal life
Allemeier, his wife Meredith and their two sons live in Calgary, Alberta. He is an avid rock-climber, hiker and cross country skier.

References

External links
 Certified Chef de Cuisine Recipient List
 Michael Allemeier at the Chef and Restaurant Database
 Food + Leisure Winery Restaurant of the Year 2008.
https://www.canadianculinaryinstitute.ca/news--events/calgarys-michael-allemeier-one-of-only-three-master-chefs-in-canada.html
https://www.restobiz.ca/the-road-to-master-chef-an-inside-look-at-the-journey-to-achieving-culinary-mastery-in-canada/

1967 births
Living people
Canadian food writers
Canadian television chefs
People from the Regional District of Central Okanagan
Canadian male chefs